Elvin Aliyev (born 21 August 1984) is an Azerbaijani footballer who plays as defender for FC Baku.

External links
 

1984 births
Living people
Azerbaijani footballers
Azerbaijan international footballers
People from Sabirabad
AZAL PFK players
FC Baku players
MOIK Baku players
Ravan Baku FC players
Azerbaijan Premier League players
FK MKT Araz players
Association football defenders
Neftçi PFK players